is a Japanese actress, model and singer. She has had a prolific career in television drama series since the mid-1990s and since 2003  has also been in several films. She was formerly known as Megumi Matsumoto (松本恵).

Acting career

Television dramas
 Taiyō no Kisetsu (2002)
 Stand Up!! (2003), Shiho Tominaga
 Aim for the Ace! (2004), Reika Ryūzaki
 Tokyo Friends (2005), Hirono Hayama

Filmography
 Tomie: Beginning (2005), Tomie Kawakami
 Tokyo Friends: The Movie (2006), Hirono Hayama
 God's Puzzle (2008), Shiratori
 The Chasing World (2008), Riaru Onigokko
 Wangan Midnight: The Movie (2009), Reina Akikawa
 Love Strikes! (2011), Natsuki Komiyama
 Tomie: Unlimited (2011), Tomie (cameo)

Music career
She released a single in 2004.

References

External links
 

1982 births
Japanese female models
Japanese idols
Japanese child actresses
Japanese television personalities
Living people
Japanese actresses